Vahina Giocante (born 30 June 1981) is a French actress.

Career
As Marie in Marie Baie des Anges (1997), she is among a group of young wanderers who become enmeshed in love, hate, and violence on the French Riviera.

In 1999 she appeared in No Scandal directed by Benoît Jacquot.

In the 2004 film directed by Ziad Doueiri, Lila Says (French title: Lila dit ça), Giocante portrays a teenager who resides with her aunt in a rough neighborhood in Marseilles. Chief film critic for The New York Times A.O. Scott compared her to Brigitte Bardot in And God Created Woman, being a femme more vital than fatale. He further wrote that Ms. Giocante's intoxicating mixture of gamine innocence and womanly knowingness is almost too much for the movie but her charisma.......give it a mood that is at once breathlessly romantic and cannily down to earth.

In 2009 she appeared in Bellamy, the last film of celebrated French director Claude Chabrol.

Personal life
Vahina Giocante is of half Corsican and half Andalusian origin. She lived on Corsica until the age of 10. Born in Orléans, she went to school at the Lycée Paul-Cézanne in Aix-en-Provence.

Selected filmography
 SKAM France (2021) Céline Prigent
 Mata Hari (2017) Mata Hari
 Paradise Cruise (2013) - Dora
Un prince (presque) charmant (2013) Marie
 30 Beats (2011) Kim
 La blonde aux seins nus (2010)
 Trader Games (Original title: Krach (2010) 
 Le Premier Cercle (2009) – Elodie
 Bellamy (2009) – Nadia Sancho
 Secret Défense (2008) – (Diane / Lisa)
 99 Francs (2007) – (Sophie)
 A Curtain Raiser (2006) Rosette
 U (2006) – (voice)
 Riviera (2005) – Stella
 Nuit noire, 17 octobre 1961 (2005) (TV) – Marie-Hélène
 Lila dit ça ("Lila Says") (2004) – Lila
 Cadeau d'Éléna, Le ("Elena's Gift") (2004) – Marie
 Maigret: Les petits cochons sans queue (2004) (TV) – Germaine Leblanc
 Blueberry: L'expérience secrète ("Renegade") (2004) – Madeleine
 Intermittenze del cuore, Le (2003) – young Fiametta
 Soldats de Salamine ("Soldiers of Salamina") (2003) – assistante sociale à Dijon
 Vivante ("Alive") (2002) – Claire
 "Algérie des chimères, L'" (2001) (mini) TV Series – Jeanne 20 ans
 Bella ciao (2001) – Bianca
 Fantômes de Louba, Les (2001) – Jeannie as a teenager
 Libertin, Le ("The Libertine") (2000) – Angélique Diderot
 Pas de scandale ("Keep It Quiet" / "No Scandal") (1999) – Stéphanie
 Stolen Life (1998) – Sigga
 Marie Baie des Anges'' ("Angel Sharks" / "Marie from the Bay of Angels") (1997) – Marie

References

External links

 
 Unofficial site on Vahina Giocante 
 Vahina Giocante: confidences of a changing actress 
 Profile in Elle Magazine  

1981 births
Living people
French film actresses
Actors from Orléans
French television actresses
20th-century French actresses
21st-century French actresses